Morgan Township is one of thirteen townships in Butler County, Ohio, United States. It is located in the southwestern corner of the county, on the state line with Indiana. It had a population of 5,345 at the 2020 census.

History
The tenth in order of creation, Morgan Township was erected from Ross Township by the Butler County Commissioners (James Blackburn, William Robison, and John Wingate) on March 4, 1811.

Geography
Located in the southwestern corner of the county, it borders the following townships:
Reily Township - north
Hanover Township - northeast corner
Ross Township - east
Crosby Township, Hamilton County - southeast
Harrison Township, Hamilton County - south
Harrison Township, Dearborn County, Indiana - southwest corner
Whitewater Township, Franklin County, Indiana - west
Springfield Township, Franklin County, Indiana - northwest corner

Name
Named for General Daniel Morgan, an officer in the American Revolutionary War, it is one of six Morgan Townships statewide.

Transportation
Major highways include State Routes 126, 129, and 748.

Government
The township is governed by a three-member board of trustees, who are elected in November of odd-numbered years to a four-year term beginning on the following January 1.  Two are elected in the year after the presidential election and one is elected in the year before it.  There is also an elected township fiscal officer, who serves a four-year term beginning on April 1 of the year after the election, which is held in November of the year before the presidential election.  Vacancies in the fiscal officership or on the board of trustees are filled by the remaining trustees.

References

General
 Bert S. Barlow, W.H. Todhunter, Stephen D. Cone, Joseph J. Pater, and Frederick Schneider, eds.  Centennial History of Butler County, Ohio.  Hamilton, Ohio:  B.F. Bowen, 1905.
 Jim Blount.  The 1900s:  100 Years In the History of Butler County, Ohio.  Hamilton, Ohio:  Past Present Press, 2000.
 Butler County Engineer's Office.  Butler County Official Transportation Map, 2003.  Fairfield Township, Butler County, Ohio:  The Office, 2003.
 A History and Biographical Cyclopaedia of Butler County, Ohio with Illustrations and Sketches of Its Representative Men and Pioneers.  Cincinnati, Ohio:  Western Biographical Publishing Company, 1882. 
 Ohio. Secretary of State.  The Ohio municipal and township roster, 2002-2003.  Columbus, Ohio:  The Secretary, 2003.

External links
Township website
County website

Townships in Butler County, Ohio
Townships in Ohio
1811 establishments in Ohio
Populated places established in 1811